Arben Muskaj (born 27 June 1994 in Patos, Albania) is an Albanian footballer who currently plays as a defender for Souli Paramythias in the Gamma Ethniki.

Career

Under-20
Muskaj was part of the Albania U20 side that competed in the 2013 Mediterranean Games held in Mersin, Turkey where he played in all five games.

References

1994 births
Living people
People from Patos (municipality)
Association football fullbacks
Albanian footballers
Albania under-21 international footballers
PAS Giannina F.C. players
FK Partizani Tirana players
KF Bylis Ballsh players
Kategoria Superiore players
Kategoria e Parë players
Albanian expatriate footballers
Expatriate footballers in Greece
Albanian expatriate sportspeople in Greece
Competitors at the 2013 Mediterranean Games
Mediterranean Games competitors for Albania